The NCAA Women's Division III Cross Country Championship is an annual cross country meet to decide the team and individual national champions of women's NCAA Division III intercollegiate cross country running in the United States. It is held every fall, usually in November the Saturday before Thanksgiving.

The most successful program is Johns Hopkins, with eighth national titles. The current champions are Johns Hopkins, who won their eighth title in 2022.

Format  
The race included 9 teams in 1981, 12 teams from 1982 to 1986, 14 teams from 1987 to 1992, 21 teams from 1993 to 1998 and 24 teams from 1999 to 2005. Beginning in 2006, the national championship race has included 32 teams. Teams compete in one of eight regional championships to qualify. In addition to the 32 teams, 56 individual runners qualify for the national championship.

Champions 
The race distance was 5,000 meters (5 kilometers) from 1981 to 2001 and 6,000 meters (6 kilometers) from 2002 to the present.

A † indicates a then-NCAA record-setting time for that particular distance.
A time highlighted in ██ indicates the all-time NCAA championship record for that distance.

Summary

Team titles

 Note: Schools highlight in yellow have reclassified athletics from NCAA Division III.

See also
NCAA Women's Cross Country Championships (Division I, Division II)
NCAA Men's Cross Country Championships (Division I, Division II, Division III)
Pre-NCAA Cross Country Champions
NAIA Cross Country Championships (Men, Women)

References

External links
NCAA Women's Cross Country
Year-by-Year results (USTFCCCA)
NCAA Div III Cross Country Historian's Report

 Division III
Women's sports competitions in the United States
Women's athletics competitions